Barbara M. Stafford (born May 7, 1953) is a former member of the Virginia House of Delegates. She won a special election to succeed her husband, Jeff Stafford, who died in office in 1990. Her district included parts of Bland, Giles and Tazewell counties.

In the subsequent 1991 general election, Democrat Grover Jennings defeated Republican Barnes Lee Kidd of Tazewell, but the results were reversed in the 1993 general election, and in 1995 Democrat John H. Tate Jr. defeated Kidd.

References

External links
Official Delegate biography

1953 births
Living people
Republican Party members of the Virginia House of Delegates
Women state legislators in Virginia
Methodists from Virginia
People from Giles County, Virginia